Kuchuk is a rural locality (a selo) and the administrative center of Kuchuksky Selsoviet, Shelabolikhinsky District, Altai Krai, Russia. The population was 994 as of 2013. There are 12 streets.

Geography 
Kuchuk is located 15 km northwest of Shelabolikha (the district's administrative centre) by road. Sibirka is the nearest rural locality.

References 

Rural localities in Shelabolikhinsky District